Tennis events were contested at the 1987 Summer Universiade in Zagreb, Yugoslavia.

Medal summary

Medal table

See also
 Tennis at the Summer Universiade

External links
World University Games Tennis on HickokSports.com

1987
Universiade
1987 Summer Universiade
Tennis in Yugoslavia